Zachary Sawchenko (born December 30, 1997) is a Canadian professional ice hockey Goaltender currently playing for the Chicago Wolves of the American Hockey League, as a prospect to the Carolina Hurricanes of the National Hockey League (NHL).

Playing career
Sawchenko was signed as an undrafted free agent to a three-year, entry-level contract with the Sharks on April 12, 2021 and made his NHL debut on January 2, 2022, in an 8–5 loss to the Pittsburgh Penguins.

As a free agent, Sawchenko was signed to a one-year, two-way contract with the Carolina Hurricanes on July 14, 2022.

Career statistics

Regular season and playoffs

International

References

External links

1997 births
Living people
Alberta Golden Bears ice hockey players
Allen Americans players
Canadian expatriate ice hockey players in the United States
Canadian ice hockey goaltenders
Chicago Wolves players
Moose Jaw Warriors players
San Jose Barracuda players
San Jose Sharks players
Ice hockey people from Calgary
Undrafted National Hockey League players